Oquitoa Municipality is a municipality in Sonora in north-western Mexico.

Area and population
The municipal area is 636.64 km2 with a population of 402 registered in 2000.  Most of this population lives in the small municipal seat.  It is located at an elevation of 579 meters.

Neighboring municipalities
Neighboring municipalities are Atil Municipality to the northeast; Trincheras Municipality to the southeast, and  Altar Municipality to the west.

References

Municipalities of Sonora